John Edward Ahern (December 4, 1934 – December 19, 2020) was an American politician of the Republican Party who served in the Washington House of Representatives, representing the 6th district from 2001 to 2009 and 2011 to 2013. Ahern was born in Havre, Montana, and lived with his family in Silver Springs, Maryland. He went to the University of Maryland and served in the United States Army Reserves. Ahern was a Catholic. He received his undergrad education from the University of Denver and had a law degree from Gonzaga University. He was involved with the office products and supplies business in Spokane, Washington.

Personal life 
Ahern's wife was Nancy Ahern. They have three children. Ahern and his family live in Spokane, Washington.

Ahern died on December 19, 2020, in Spokane, Washington, at age 86.

References

1934 births
2020 deaths
Businesspeople from Spokane, Washington
Politicians from Spokane, Washington
People from Silver Spring, Maryland
People from Havre, Montana
Military personnel from Montana
Republican Party members of the Washington House of Representatives
Montana Republicans
Catholics from Washington (state)
University of Denver alumni
Gonzaga University alumni